Dedovsk is a town in Istrinsky District of Moscow Oblast, Russia, located  west of Moscow and  southeast of Istra, the administrative center of the district. Population:  It was previously known as Dedovo/Dedovsky (until 1940).

History
In 1913, a textile factory was built in the area, which would give birth to the settlement of Dedovsky and absorb the village of Dedovo. In 1940, the settlement was granted town status and given its present name.

Administrative and municipal status
Within the framework of administrative divisions, it is, together with two rural localities, incorporated within Istrinsky District as the Town of Dedovsk. As a municipal division, the Town of Dedovsk is incorporated within Istrinsky Municipal District as Dedovsk Urban Settlement.

Notable people
Roman Madyanov (1962) — Russian actor
Roman Shirokov (1981) — Russian professional football player
Sergei Vyshedkevich (1975) — Russian professional ice hockey player
Valeriy Iordan (1992) — Russian athlete

References

Notes

Sources

External links

Dedovsk Business Directory 

Cities and towns in Moscow Oblast